Francesco Mancini  (16 January 1672 – 22 September 1737) was a Neapolitan composer.

Biography
He was an important teacher and managed to obtain his greatest duty during Alessandro Scarlatti's absence from the Neapolitan court, between 1702 and 1708. In this period he was Director of the Conservatorio di S Maria di Loreto as well as being first organist and maestro of the Capella Reale. His assistant was Giuseppe Porsile.

Works
His works include 29 operas (including L’Idaspe fedele), sonatas, 7 serenatas, 12 oratorios and more than 200 secular cantatas in addition to assorted sacred music and a small amount of instrumental music. Today he is best known for his recorder sonatas.

Recordings
Missa Septimus SSATB [25'46"]. Currende, cond. Erik Van Nevel. KTC4031

References

External links
HOASM

1672 births
1737 deaths
Italian male classical composers
Italian Baroque composers
Musicians from Naples
Italian opera composers
Male opera composers
18th-century Italian composers
18th-century Italian male musicians